Jiří Vogler (born 2 February 1946) is a Czech former sports shooter. He competed in the 50 metre rifle, prone event at the 1972, 1976 and 1980 Summer Olympics.

References

1932 births
Living people
Czech male sport shooters
Olympic shooters of Czechoslovakia
Shooters at the 1972 Summer Olympics
Shooters at the 1976 Summer Olympics
Shooters at the 1980 Summer Olympics
Sportspeople from Přerov